"Hypnotised" is a song by British rock band Coldplay from their EP Kaleidoscope (2017). It was released by Parlophone on 2 March 2017 as an excerpt from the EP instead of a single. The track was written by all four members of the band, while production was handled by Rik Simpson and Bill Rahko. A lyric video directed by Mary Wigmore came out in the same day. In June 2017, Brian Eno created an app available on iOS and Android devices to be played alongside the song to enhance it. The song was then followed by the release of "All I Can Think About Is You" and "Aliens", with the latter being a charity single.

Track listing

Personnel
Coldplay
Guy Berryman – bass guitar
Jonny Buckland – lead guitar
Will Champion – drums, backing vocals, programming
Chris Martin – lead vocals, piano, acoustic guitar, keyboards

Production
Rik Simpson – production
Bill Rahko – production

Charts

References

2017 songs
Coldplay songs
Parlophone singles
Songs written by Chris Martin
Songs written by Guy Berryman
Songs written by Jonny Buckland
Songs written by Will Champion
Song recordings produced by Rik Simpson